Werner Aisslinger (born 3 November 1964 in Nördlingen) is a German furniture designer. He is the designer of the Loftcube, a modular room structure intended for placement on rooftops.

References

German furniture designers
1964 births
Living people